The 2014–15 Sacramento State Hornets men's basketball team represented California State University, Sacramento during the 2014–15 NCAA Division I men's basketball season. The Hornets were led by seventh year head coach Brian Katz and played their home games at Hornets Nest. They were members of the Big Sky Conference. They finished the season 21–12, 13–5 in Big Sky play to finish in a tie for third place. They advanced to the semifinals of the Big Sky tournament where they lost to Eastern Washington. They were invited to the CollegeInsider.com Tournament where they defeated Portland in the first round before losing in the second round to fellow Big Sky member Northern Arizona.

Roster

Schedule

|-
!colspan=9 style="background:#004840; color:#B39650;"| Exhibition season

|-
!colspan=9 style="background:#004840; color:#B39650;"| Regular season

|-
!colspan=9 style="background:#004840; color:#B39650;"|  Big Sky tournament

|-
!colspan=9 style="background:#004840; color:#B39650;"| CIT

See also
2014–15 Sacramento State Hornets women's basketball team

References

Sacramento State Hornets men's basketball seasons
Sacramento State
Sacramento State